Bindone is an organic compound with the formula C6H4COCH2C=C(CO)2C6H4. A yellowish solid, it is classified as an aromatic triketone.

Bindone is used as a colour test for the detection of primary amines. It turns violet in their presence. Aromatic amines turn this reagent blue.

Bindone can be prepared by the condensation of two equivalents of 1,3-indandione.

References

External links

Triketones